The 1812 United States presidential election in Louisiana took place between October 30 and December 2, 1812, as part of the 1812 United States presidential election. The state legislature chose three representatives, or electors to the Electoral College, who voted for President and Vice President.

Louisiana, which became the 18th state on April 30, 1812, cast its three electoral votes to Democratic Republican candidate and incumbent President James Madison in the states first presidential election.

See also
 United States presidential elections in Louisiana

References

Louisiana
1812
1812 Louisiana elections